The Colleen Stakes is an American Thoroughbred horse race held annually during the first part of August at Monmouth Park Racetrack in Oceanport, New Jersey. Open to two-year-old fillies, it is contested on dirt over a distance of  furlongs (1,210 yards / 1,106 meters).

Inaugurated in 1887 at the Monmouth Park Association racetrack in Long Branch, New Jersey, it was raced at Jerome Park Racetrack in Fordham, New York, in 1891 as a result of political pressure from New Jersey State anti-gambling politicians. The race returned to Monmouth Park for 1892 and 1893, after which the New Jersey Legislature enacted laws that ended betting in the state, and the racetrack was forced out of business. In 1946, the New Jersey Legislature passed a bill providing for state regulation of horse racing, and the new Monmouth Park Racetrack opened that year with the Colleen Stakes as part of its regular racing schedule.

The Colleen Stakes was run in two divisions in 1949, 1980, 1986 and 1987.

In 2012, the distance was reduced from  furlongs to 5 furlongs.

Records
Speed record:
 0:56.68 - Funfair (2012) (At current distance)
 1:02.80 - American Royale  (1991) (new stakes and track record)

Winners

Earlier winners

1995 - Careless Heiress
1993 - At The Half
1992 - Royal Linkage
1991 - American Royale
1990 - Barbara's Nemesis
1989 - Chrissys Secret
1988 - Divine Answer
1987 - Blue Jean Baby  (1st Div.)
1987 - Lost Kitty  (2nd Div.)
1986 - Dr. Myrtle  (1st Div.)
1986 - Burnished Bright  (2nd Div.)
1985 - Lazer Show
1984 - Count Pennies
1983 - Hot Milk
1982 - not found
1981 - Sabotage
1980 - Queen Designate  (1st Div.)
1980 - Madame Premier   (2nd Div.)
1979 - Accipiter's Dream
1978 - Mongo Queen
1977 - Sunny Bay
1976 - Sensational
1975 - Dearly Precious
1974 - not found
1973 - Celestial Lights
1972 - Marian Z
1971 - Rondeau
1970 - Deceit
1969 - Ashua
1968 - Process Shot
1967 - Syrian Sea
1966 - Rhubarb
1965 - Never In Paris
1964 - Queen Empress
1963 - Busy Jill
1962 - No Resisting
1961 - Batter Up
1960 - Little Tumbler
1959 - Rose of Serro
1958 - Lady Be Good
1957 - Poly Hi
1956 - Leallah
1955 - Doubledogdare
1954 - High Voltage
1953 - Incidentally & Lady Bouncer
1952 - Late Model
1951 - Star-Enfin
1950 - Sungari
1949 - Almahmoud  (1st Div.)
1949 - Bed O' Roses  (2nd Div.)
1948 - Raise You
1947 - Elastic
1946 - Pipette
1893 - Beldemere
1892 - Helen Nichols
1891 - Melba
1890 - Reckon
1889 - Starlight
1888 - Felicia II
1887 - Belinda

References

 2009 Colleen Stakes results at Monmouth Park
 Monmouth Park 2010 stakes race schedule and details for the Colleen Stakes

Ungraded stakes races in the United States
Horse races in New Jersey
Flat horse races for two-year-old fillies
Recurring sporting events established in 1887
Monmouth Park Racetrack
1887 establishments in New Jersey